The State of Palestine has a network of diplomatic missions worldwide, predominantly in Africa, Asia, Eastern Europe, Latin America, and the Middle East. However, due to its ongoing tensions with Israel as part of the Arab–Israeli conflict, the scope of Palestine's diplomatic network has been relatively limited in the Western/Western-aligned world, with many of these countries permitting only sub-diplomatic relations with lower-than-embassy-status missions.

Africa

 Algiers (Embassy)

 Luanda (Embassy)

 Brazzaville (Embassy)

 Djibouti City (Embassy)

 Cairo (Embassy)

 Addis Ababa (Embassy)

 Libreville (Embassy)

 Accra (Embassy)

 Conakry (Embassy)

 Bissau (Embassy)

 Abidjan (Embassy)

 Nairobi (Embassy)

 Tripoli (Embassy)

 Bamako (Embassy)

 Nouakchott (Embassy)

 Rabat (Embassy)

 Maputo (Embassy)

 Windhoek (Embassy)

 Abuja (Embassy)

 Dakar (Embassy)

 Pretoria (Embassy)

 Khartoum (Embassy)

 Dar es Salaam (Embassy)

 Tunis (Embassy)

 Lusaka (Embassy)

 Harare (Embassy)

Americas

 Buenos Aires (Embassy)

 La Paz (Embassy)

 Brasília (Embassy)

 Ottawa (General Delegation)

 Santiago (Embassy)

 Bogotá (Embassy)

 Havana (Embassy)

 Quito (Embassy)

 San Salvador (Embassy)

 Mexico City (Special Delegation)

 Managua (Embassy)

 Lima (Embassy)

 Montevideo (Embassy)

 Caracas (Embassy)

Asia

 Baku (Embassy)

 Manama (Embassy)

 Dhaka (Embassy)

 Beijing (Embassy)

 New Delhi (Embassy)

 Jakarta (Embassy)

 Tehran (Embassy)

 Baghdad (Embassy)

 Tokyo (General Mission)

 Amman (Embassy)

 Astana (Embassy)

 Kuwait City (Embassy)

 Beirut (Embassy)

 Kuala Lumpur (Embassy)

 Pyongyang (Embassy)

 Muscat (Embassy)

 Islamabad (Embassy)

 Manila (Embassy)

 Doha (Embassy)

 Riyadh (Embassy)

 Colombo (Embassy)

 Damascus (Embassy)

 Dushanbe (Embassy)

 Ankara (Embassy)
 Istanbul (Consulate-General)

 Ashgabat (Embassy)

 Abu Dhabi (Embassy)
 Dubai (Consulate-General)

 Tashkent (Embassy)

 Hanoi (Embassy)

 Sana'a (Embassy)

Europe

 Tirana (Embassy)

 Vienna (Permanent Mission)

 Minsk (Embassy)

 Brussels (Mission)

 Sarajevo (Embassy)

 Sofia (Embassy)

 Nicosia (Embassy)

 Prague (Embassy)

 Copenhagen (Mission)

 Helsinki (mission)

 Paris (Mission)

 Berlin (Mission)

 Athens (Mission)

 Rome (Embassy)

 Budapest (Embassy)

 Dublin (Mission)

 Rome (Mission)

 Valletta (Embassy)

 The Hague (General Delegation)

 Oslo (Mission)

 Warsaw (Embassy)

 Lisbon (Mission)

 Bucharest (Embassy)

 Moscow (Embassy)

 Belgrade (Embassy)

 Bratislava (Embassy)

 Madrid (Mission)

 Stockholm (Embassy)

 Bern (General Delegation)

 Kyiv (Embassy)

 London (Mission)

Oceania

 Canberra (General Delegation)

Multilateral organisations
 Cairo (Permanent Mission to the Arab League)
 Geneva (Permanent Observer Mission to the United Nations)
 New York City (Permanent Observer Mission to the United Nations)
Accredited as representative office to 
 Paris (Permanent Mission to UNESCO)
 Jeddah (Permanent Mission to OIC)

Gallery

See also

 Foreign relations of Palestine
 List of diplomatic missions in Palestine

Notes

References

External links
 Embassy World: Embassies of Palestine
 Palestinian Embassies Abroad
 Directory – Palestine Embassies, Missions, Delegations Abroad

 
Palestine
Diplomatic missions